United Nations Security Council resolution 1498, adopted unanimously on 4 August 2003, after reaffirming resolutions 1464 (2003) and 1479 (2003) on the situation in Côte d'Ivoire (Ivory Coast), the council renewed authorisation given to the Economic Community of West African States (ECOWAS) and French forces operating in the country to assist the peace process for an additional six months.

The Security Council reaffirmed the sovereignty, territorial integrity and independence of Côte d'Ivoire, in addition to the principles of good-neighbourliness, non-interference and co-operation. It was important that the Government of National Reconciliation extended its authority throughout the country and that a disarmament, demobilisation and reintegration programme was implemented.

The resolution extended the mandate of West African and French forces and requested both to report on the implementation of their mandates. Earlier in 2003, the council had established the United Nations Mission in Côte d'Ivoire.

See also
 Ivorian Civil War
 List of United Nations Security Council Resolutions 1401 to 1500 (2002–2003)
 Opération Licorne

References

External links
 
Text of the Resolution at undocs.org

 1498
 1498
2003 in Ivory Coast
August 2003 events